In mathematics and abstract algebra, group theory studies the algebraic structures known as groups. The concept of a group is central to abstract algebra: other well-known algebraic structures, such as rings, fields, and vector spaces, can all be seen as groups endowed with additional operations and axioms. Groups recur throughout mathematics, and the methods of group theory have influenced many parts of algebra. Linear algebraic groups and Lie groups are two branches of group theory that have experienced advances and have become subject areas in their own right.

Various physical systems, such as crystals and the hydrogen atom, may be modelled by symmetry groups. Thus group theory and the closely related representation theory have many important applications in physics, chemistry, and materials science. Group theory is also central to public key cryptography.

Structures and operations

 Central extension
 Direct product of groups
 Direct sum of groups
 Extension problem
 Free abelian group
 Free group
 Free product
 Generating set of a group
 Group cohomology
 Group extension
 Presentation of a group
 Product of group subsets
 Schur multiplier
 Semidirect product
 Sylow theorems
 Hall subgroup
 Wreath product

Basic properties of groups

Butterfly lemma
 Center of a group
 Centralizer and normalizer
 Characteristic subgroup
 Commutator
 Composition series
 Conjugacy class
 Conjugate closure
 Conjugation of isometries in Euclidean space
 Core (group)
 Coset
 Derived group
 Euler's theorem
 Fitting subgroup
Generalized Fitting subgroup
 Hamiltonian group
 Identity element
 Lagrange's theorem
 Multiplicative inverse
 Normal subgroup
 Perfect group
 p-core
 Schreier refinement theorem
 Subgroup
 Transversal (combinatorics)
 Torsion subgroup
 Zassenhaus lemma

Group homomorphisms

 Automorphism
 Automorphism group
 Factor group
 Fundamental theorem on homomorphisms
 Group homomorphism
 Group isomorphism
 Homomorphism
 Isomorphism theorem
 Inner automorphism
 Order automorphism
 Outer automorphism group
 Quotient group

Basic types of groups

 Examples of groups
 Abelian group
 Cyclic group
 Rank of an abelian group
 Dicyclic group
 Dihedral group
 Divisible group
 Finitely generated abelian group
 Group representation
 Klein four-group
 List of small groups
 Locally cyclic group
 Nilpotent group
 Non-abelian group
 Solvable group
 P-group
 Pro-finite group

Simple groups and their classification
Classification of finite simple groups

 Alternating group
 Borel subgroup
 Chevalley group
 Conway group
 Feit–Thompson theorem
 Fischer group
 General linear group
 Group of Lie type
 Group scheme
 HN group
 Janko group
 Lie group
 Simple Lie group
 Linear algebraic group
 List of finite simple groups
 Mathieu group
 Monster group
 Baby Monster group
 Bimonster
 Parabolic subgroup
 Projective group
 Reductive group
 Simple group
 Quasisimple group
 Special linear group
 Symmetric group
 Thompson group (finite)
 Tits group
 Weyl group

Permutation and symmetry groups

 Arithmetic group
 Braid group
 Burnside's lemma
 Cayley's Theorem
 Coxeter group
 Crystallographic group
 Crystallographic point group, Schoenflies notation
 Discrete group
 Euclidean group
 Even and odd permutations
 Frieze group
 Frobenius group
 Fuchsian group
 Geometric group theory
 Group action
 Homogeneous space
 Hyperbolic group
 Isometry group
 Orbit (group theory)
 Permutation
 Permutation group
 Rubik's Cube group
 Space group
 Stabilizer subgroup
 Steiner system
 Strong generating set
 Symmetry
 Symmetric group
 Symmetry group
 Wallpaper group

Concepts groups share with other mathematics

 Associativity
 Bijection
 Bilinear operator
 Binary operation
 Commutative
 Congruence relation
 Equivalence class
 Equivalence relation
 Lattice (group)
 Lattice (discrete subgroup)
 Multiplication table
 Prime number
 Up to

Mathematical objects making use of a group operation

 Abelian variety
 Algebraic group
 Banach-Tarski paradox
 Category of groups
 Dimensional analysis
 Elliptic curve
 Galois group
 Gell-Mann matrices
 Group object
 Hilbert space
 Integer
 Lie group
 Matrix
 Modular arithmetic
 Number
 Pauli matrices
 Real number
 Quaternion
 Quaternion group
 Tensor

Mathematical fields & topics making important use of group theory
 Algebraic geometry
 Algebraic topology
 Discrete space
 Fundamental group
 Geometry
 Homology
 Minkowski's theorem
 Topological group

Algebraic structures related to groups

 Field
 Finite field
 Galois theory
 Grothendieck group
 Group ring
 Group with operators
 Heap
 Linear algebra
 Magma
 Module
 Monoid
 Monoid ring
 Quandle
 Quasigroup
 Quantum group
 Ring
 Semigroup
 Vector space

Group representations

 Affine representation
 Character theory
 Great orthogonality theorem
 Maschke's theorem
 Monstrous moonshine
 Projective representation
 Representation theory
 Schur's lemma

Computational group theory

 Coset enumeration
 Schreier's subgroup lemma
 Schreier–Sims algorithm
 Todd–Coxeter algorithm

Applications
 Computer algebra system
 Cryptography
 Discrete logarithm
 Triple DES
 Caesar cipher
 Exponentiating by squaring
 Knapsack problem
 Shor's algorithm
 Standard Model
 Symmetry in physics

Famous problems
 Burnside's problem
 Classification of finite simple groups
 Herzog–Schönheim conjecture
 Subset sum problem
 Whitehead problem
 Word problem for groups

Other topics

 Amenable group
 Capable group
 Commensurability (group theory)
 Compact group
 Compactly generated group
 Complete group
 Congruence subgroup
 Continuous symmetry
 Frattini subgroup
 Growth rate
 Heisenberg group, discrete Heisenberg group
 Molecular symmetry
 Nielsen transformation
 Tarski monster group
 Thompson groups
 Tietze transformation
 Transfer (group theory)

Group theorists

 N. Abel
 M. Aschbacher
 R. Baer
 R. Brauer
 W. Burnside
 R. Carter
 A. Cauchy
 A. Cayley
 J.H. Conway
 R. Dedekind
 L.E. Dickson
 M. Dunwoody
 W. Feit
 B. Fischer
 H. Fitting
 G. Frattini
 G. Frobenius
 E. Galois
 G. Glauberman
 D. Gorenstein
 R.L. Griess
 M. Hall, Jr.
 P. Hall
 G. Higman
 D. Hilbert
 O. Hölder
 B. Huppert
 K. Iwasawa
 Z. Janko
 C. Jordan
 F. Klein
 A. Kurosh
 J.L. Lagrange
 C. Leedham-Green
 F.W. Levi
 Sophus Lie
 W. Magnus
 E. Mathieu
 G.A. Miller
 B.H. Neumann
 H. Neumann
 J. Nielson
 Emmy Noether
 Ø. Ore
 O. Schreier
 I. Schur
 R. Steinberg
 M. Suzuki
 L. Sylow
 J. Thompson
 J. Tits
 Helmut Wielandt
 H. Zassenhaus
 M. Zorn

See also
 List of abstract algebra topics
 List of category theory topics
 List of Lie group topics

 
Mathematics-related lists
Outlines of mathematics and logic
Wikipedia outlines